Yuxarı Çəmənli (also, Yukhary Chemenli) is a village and municipality in the Beylagan Rayon of Azerbaijan.  It has a population of 514.

References 

Populated places in Beylagan District